Marek Kostrzewa (born 19 June 1957) is a Polish football manager and former player.

References

1957 births
Living people
Sportspeople from Lublin
Polish footballers
Poland international footballers
Association football midfielders
KS Lublinianka players
Avia Świdnik players
Concordia Knurów players
Górnik Zabrze players
AS Cherbourg Football players
Błękitni Kielce players
Ekstraklasa players
I liga players
II liga players
Polish football managers
GKS Tychy managers
Górnik Łęczna managers
Górnik Zabrze managers
Polish expatriate footballers
Expatriate footballers in France
Polish expatriate sportspeople in France